The Atmaram Award is an honor in India, which is given in memory of the Indian scientist, Atmaram. It is one of the major awards given by the Central Hindi Directorate, (Kendriya Hindi Sansthan), Ministry of Human Resource Development. It is conferred annually for an outstanding contribution in the field of scientific and technical literature and instrument development. The Atmaram award is given by the Central Hindi Directorate, Ministry of Human Resource Development, Government of India. The award carries  in cash, a plaque and a citation. It is given to two people each year.

Recipients

References 

Indian literary awards
Awards established in 1989